Applied Science University (Arabic: جامعة العلوم التطبيقية الخاصة) is a private university located in the Shafa Badran suburb of Amman, in Jordan. It was established in 1991 as the largest private university in Jordan in terms of campus area and number of students' enrollment.
It is ranked among top universities in Jordan, It was the first private university in Jordan to provide Marketing major, its English programs in engineering and physical sciences are considered one of the best in Jordan and the Middle East. The university's basketball team plays in the Jordanian premium league, It is the only university that has an athletic team that plays in a premium league in Jordan. 
In the academic year 2009/2010 there were 7866 students of whom 2991 (38%) were international students.

It has a variety of ways to hold vehicles within the campus, with a huge parking lot and an organized place to charge electric cars.

The campus includes many faculties that are embedded with different majors, that are offered in both English and Arabic curriculum.

Faculties 
Faculty of Arts & Science 
Faculty of Art & Design
Faculty of Business
Faculty of Law
Faculty of Engineering and Technology
Faculty of Pharmacy
Faculty of Nursing
Faculty of Information Technology
Deanship of Research & Graduate Studies
SHARIA AND ISLAMIC STUDIES

Notable faculty
 Mohammed Dajani Daoudi (born 1946), Palestinian professor and peace activist

References 

 
Educational institutions established in 1991
Applied Science Private University
1991 establishments in Jordan